Mi-rae is a Korean given name, in modern times used as a feminine name. There are 33 hanja with the reading "mi" and 9 hanja with the reading "rae" on the South Korean government's official list of hanja which may be used in given names.

People
Korean people with this name include:
 Kim Mi-rae (born 2001), North Korean diver
 Yoon Mi-rae (born Natasha Shanta Reid, 1981), American-born South Korean rapper and singer

Fictional characters
Fictional characters with this name include
 Cha Mi-rae, in the 2006 South Korean television series Fireworks
 Yoo Mi-rae, in the 2006 South Korean television drama Great Inheritance
 Na Mi-rae, in the 2008 South Korean television drama Jungle Fish
 Shin Mi-rae, in the 2009 South Korean television series The City Hall
 Mi-rae, in the South Korean-Japanese romantic-drama film After the Banquet
 Mi-rae, in the South Korean rerun (2009-present) year-end drama Father's House
 Yoon Mi-rae, in the 2012 South Korean television series How Long I've Kissed
 Cha Mi-rae, in the 2013 South Korean television drama Passionate Love
 Kim Mi-rae, in the 2013 South Korean television series 7th Grade Civil Servant
 Lee Mi-rae, in the 2013 South Korean sports-comedy film The King of Jokgu
 Na Mi-rae, in the 2013 South Korean television series Marry Him If You Dare
 Choi Mi-rae, in the 2014 South Korean television series Schoolgirl Detectives
 Hong Mi-rae, in the 2014 South Korean television series Only Love
 Hong Mi-rae, in the 2015 South Korean television series Glamorous Temptation
 Lee Mi-rae, in the 2015 South Korean television series Office
 Mi-rae, in the 2016 South Korean comedy-drama film Familyhood
 Byun Mi-rae, in the 2016 South Korean television series Secrets of Women
 Cha Mi-rae, in the 2016 South Korean television series Super Daddy Yeol
 Ryu Mi-rae, in the 2017 South Korean television series Duel
 Kang Mi-rae, in the 2018 South Korean television series Gangnam Beauty
 Nam Mi-rae, in the 2018 South Korean morning soap opera Lady Cha Dal-rae's Lover
 Kim Mi-rae, in the 2018 South Korean television series A Poem a Day
 Kang Mi-rae, in the 2019 South Korean television series Doctor John
 Yoon Mi-rae, in the 2019 South Korean television series I Wanna Hear Your Song
 Noh Mi-rae, in the 2020 South Korean-Chinese web drama How Are U Bread

See also
Mirai (given name), Japanese name equivalent
List of Korean given names

References

Korean feminine given names